Susan Mallery (born 1970) is an American author of popular romance novels set in non-urban, close-knit communities. Because of her love for animals, pets play a significant role in her books.

Biography
Born in 1970, Susan grew up in the Los Angeles, California area.

Mallery earned an MA from Seton Hill University.

Mallery was published straight out of college with two books in January 1992.

In 2008, her book Accidentally Yours became the first to make The New York Times Best Seller list.

On July 12, 2012, her book Summer Nights reached No. 2 on The New York Times bestseller list for paperback mass-market fiction. A second book, A Christmas Bride, was No. 24 in November 2012. A Fool's Gold Christmas made the Times e-book fiction list on October 14, 2012. Three Sisters reached at No. 3 on the New York Times bestseller list.

Mallery's book Thrill Me reached No. 1 on the New York Times bestseller list the next year in 2015.

Mallery then began to foray into women's fiction, which she saw as an opportunity to explore some of the other relationships that are so important to women. Today, Mallery describes her work as "Romance-Plus" blending elements of both Contemporary romance and Women's fiction in her stories.

She lives in Washington state with her husband, two cats and a poodle. She is passionate about animal welfare and has served on the board of Seattle Humane.

Selected works

References

External links
Official website

Living people
20th-century American novelists
21st-century American novelists
American romantic fiction writers
American women novelists
Women romantic fiction writers
20th-century American women writers
21st-century American women writers
1970 births